Yuhan Tan (born 21 April 1987 in Bilzen, Belgium) is a male left-handed badminton player and Orthopedic surgeon from Belgium. Born to a Chinese-Indonesian father and a Belgian mother, He is a 10 time Belgian Champion in the men's singles category which makes him the most successful men's singles athlete in Belgian history. In 2008 he was the 2nd youngest men's singles player to qualify for the 2008 Olympics according to the Badminton World Federation criteria. However the Belgian Olympic Committee did not select him and he was therefore not able to compete. 
Tan participated at the 2012 Summer Olympics and in the 2016 Summer Olympics together with his sister Lianne. 

Tan studied Medicine at the University of Maastricht.

In 2013, Tan was elected as a member of the Badminton World Federation (BWF) Athletes' Commission. In 2015, he was appointed as the Chairman of the BWF Athletes' Commission. In June 2015, he competed at the European Games in Baku, Azerbaijan, before being eliminated at the quarter-finals.

He competed for Belgium at the 2016 Summer Olympics in badminton.  He lost to Misha Zilberman of Israel,  22-20 and 21-12, and did not advance to the Round of 16.

In 2017 Tan became the chairman of the Belgian Olympic Committee Athletes' Commission.

Personal life 
Tan's father is Chinese Indonesian, while his mother, Maria Meyers, is Belgian (Flemish). His parents met in Belgium, where his father came to study dentistry.

Achievements

BWF International Challenge/Series 
Men's singles

  BWF International Challenge tournament
  BWF International Series tournament
  BWF Future Series tournament

References

External links
 

Belgian male badminton players
Living people
1987 births
People from Bilzen
Belgian people of Indonesian descent
Belgian people of Chinese descent
Badminton players at the 2012 Summer Olympics
Badminton players at the 2016 Summer Olympics
Indonesian people of Chinese descent
Olympic badminton players of Belgium
Badminton players at the 2015 European Games
European Games competitors for Belgium
Sportspeople from Limburg (Belgium)